Robert Carlisle (died c. 1425) of Carlisle, Cumberland, was an English politician.

He was a Member (MP) of the Parliament of England for Carlisle in 1378, January 1380, 1381 and February 1388.

References

14th-century births
1425 deaths
Politicians from Carlisle, Cumbria
English MPs 1378
English MPs January 1380
English MPs 1381
English MPs February 1388